Philip Thomas Jesper Haglund (born 22 March 1987) is a Swedish footballer. A utility player, he can be deployed as a central defender, a central midfielder or a forward.

Career
Born in Stockholm, Haglund began his career with IF Brommapojkarna during the successful 2006 season, which saw the team qualify for Allsvenskan. He has subsequently played in the professional top division of Swedish football. On 10 January 2010, SC Heerenveen signed the Swedish midfielder from IF Brommapojkarna until June 2014.

After a disappointing spell in the Netherlands, he signed a three and a half year contract with Allsvenskan club IFK Göteborg on 28 June 2011. He eventually went on to play 69 games for the club, scoring 8 goals, of which a majority was from the penalty spot. His stint at Göteborg effectively came to end when he damaged his cruciate ligament in a game against IFK Norrköping in May 2014, as the club decided to not offer him a new contract during the rehab period.

Instead, he signed a two year-deal with newly promoted Hammarby from his home town Stockholm. Originally the club planned to play him in a brand new role as a central defender, but he eventually went on to establish himself as a regular starter in a midfield position. He played a total of 49 games for the club during the 2015 and 2016 season, with the club finishing 11th in the table on both occasions. However, he left the club by mutual consent in December 2016 when his contract expired.

On 9 January 2017, Haglund signed a one year-deal with the newly promoted club IK Sirius from Uppsala. He left the club at the end of 2019. On 5 March 2020, Haglund returned to Brommapojkarna, signing a deal until the end of the year.

Personal life
Haglund graduated from the science program of Blackebergs gymnasium in 2006. Haglund was enrolled at the Stockholm School of Economics and obtained his degree of Master of Science in Business and Economics in 2009. He lived in Vasastan when he played for IF Brommapojkarna.

During his stint at IFK Göteborg, Haglund was a regular blogger at the football magazine Offside.

Philip is also the founder and CEO of Gimi, a featured start-up from Stockholm.

Career statistics

Honours
;IFK Göteborg
Svenska Cupen: 2012–13

References

External links
IFK Göteborg profile

1987 births
Living people
Footballers from Stockholm
Swedish footballers
Swedish expatriate footballers
Stockholm University alumni
Association football midfielders
Stockholm School of Economics alumni
IF Brommapojkarna players
SC Heerenveen players
IK Sirius Fotboll players
IFK Göteborg players
Hammarby Fotboll players
Gröndals IK players
Allsvenskan players
Superettan players
Eredivisie players
Expatriate footballers in the Netherlands
Swedish expatriate sportspeople in the Netherlands